Yitzhak Reiter (born 5 September 1952) is an Israeli political scientist who is full professor of Islamic, Middle East and Israel Studies serving as the Head of Research Authority and Chair of Israel Studies at Ashkelon Academic College. He is also a senior researcher at both the Jerusalem Institute for Policy Research and the Harry S. Truman Institute for Peace Research of the Hebrew University of Jerusalem as well as Editor-In-Chief of Israel Academic Press.

Early life and education
Reiter was born in Rehovot, Israel to Holocaust survivors, his mother from Paszto, Hungary and his father from Leipzig, Germany. During 1965–1968 he was educated at Kibbutz Givat Haim Meuhad, and in November 1970 he joined the IDF in the Intelligence Corp. He was wounded in the 1973 War on the Egyptian front. He was trained in Islamic civilization, Arabic and Islamic and Middle East studies at the Hebrew University of Jerusalem from where he graduated with a doctorate (1991), with his thesis specializing on the Islamic Waqf.

Career
After four years of work at the L.A. Mayer Museum of Islamic Art working in numismatics, Reiter was recruited to the civil service and during 1978–1987 served as deputy advisor on Arab Affairs for three Israeli Prime Ministers—Menachem Begin, Yitzhak Shamir and Shimon Peres. He also worked as an administrative director of Al-Anba, the Israeli Arabic daily newspaper, from 1982–83. He co-founded with Shaul Mishal, the Institute for Israeli Arab Studies at Beit Berl College serving as its director. During 1993–1995 he was nominated by the Israeli government as Chairman of the Public Committee for the Integration of Arabs within the Civil Service. In 2007 he also contributed to forming Israel's Academy for the Arabic Language (Majma` al-Lugha al-Arabiyya).

Reiter taught at the Hebrew University in Islamic Studies from 1988–2003 and Conflict Resolution from 2005–2011. He also taught at Haifa University in 2004/5; IDC in 2005–6 and in 2017. During 2008–2009 he was a Schusterman Fellow teaching at the University of Minnesota in the departments of Political Science and Jewish Studies. Reiter was also a visiting scholar at St. Anthony's College, Oxford University during 2001, The Middle East Institute, Washington D.C. in 2003 and Sydney University during 2003–2004. Reiter also taught in Arabic between 2014–2016 at Al-Qasemi College, Baqa al-Gharbiyye, Israel.

Reiter's first studies pertained to the Islamic pious endowments (waqf) in Palestine under the British Mandate and in Israel. His book Islamic Endowments in Jerusalem during the British Mandate examines the role of Mandate-era Muslim institutions on the basis of 1,500 legal documents of the Shari’a court's sijillat between 1918 and 1948 and the archive of the Supreme Muslim Council located in Abu Dis.

In his National Minority, Regional Majority] Reiter used the theory of “interlocking conflict” in criticizing studies that refer only to the special tension between the Jewish and democratic nature of Israel while ignoring the impact of the regional conflict. In another article Reiter criticized the four manifestos published by Israeli Arab NGOs during 2006–2007 concluding with a vision of how to compromise between Jewish and Arab worldviews and political interests. This was the result of a three-year academic project that he initiated and headed at the Jerusalem Institute for Israel Studies concluding with a vision of "Inclusive Citizenship".

Books

Author
 Contested Holy Places in Israel-Palestine: Sharing and Conflict Resolution (London and New York: Routledge, 2017).
 The Eroding Status Quo: Conflict over Controlling the Temple Mount (Jerusalem: The Jerusalem Institute for Israel Studies and Multieducator 2017.
 Feminism in the Temple: The Struggle of the Women of the Wall to Change the Status Quo (Jerusalem: The Jerusalem Institute for Israel Studies 2017, in Hebrew)
 Contesting Symbolic Landscape in Jerusalem: Jewish/Islamic Conflict over Museum of Tolerance at Mamilla Cemetery. Brighton, Chicago, Toronto: Sussex Academic Press and The Jerusalem Institute for Israel Studies, 2014 (also in Hebrew and Arabic editions). 
  A City with a Mosque in Its Heart (with Lior Lehrs, Jerusalem: The Jerusalem Institute for Israel Studies, 2013, in Hebrew.
 War, Peace and International Relations in Islam: Muslim Scholars on Peace Accords with Israel (Brighton, Portland and Toronto: Sussex Academic Press, 2011 also in Hebrew and Arabic editions)
 The Sheikh Jarrah Affair: Strategic Implications of Jewish Settlement in an Arab Neighborhood in East Jerusalem (with Lior lehrs, Jerusalem: The Jerusalem Institute for Israel Studies, 2010).
 National Minority, Regional Majority: Palestinian Arabs versus Jews in Israel (Syracuse University Press, 2009) 
 Jerusalem and its Role in Islamic Solidarity (New York: Palgrave Macmillan, 2008).
 Islamic Institutions in Jerusalem: Palestinian Muslim Administration under Jordanian and Israeli Rule. The Hague, London and Boston: Kluwer Law International, 1997).
 Islamic Endowments in Jerusalem under British Mandate. London and Portland OR: Frank Cass, 1996). 
 The Political Life of Arabs in Israel. (with Reuben Aharoni, Beit Berl: The Institute for Israeli Arab Studies, first ed. 1992, second revised ed. 1993, in Hebrew).
 Islamic Awqaf in Jerusalem 1948-1990. Jerusalem: The Jerusalem Institute for Israel Studies, 1991. [Hebrew].

Editor
 The Arab Society in Israel (with Orna Cohen, Neve Ilan: Abraham Fund Initiatives, 2013, in Hebrew).
 Religion and Politics: Sacred Space in Palestine and Israel (with Breger, M. J., and Hammer L., London and New York: Routledge, 2012).
 Holy Places in the Israeli-Palestinian Conflict: Confrontation and Co-existence (with Breger, M. J., and Hammer L., London and New York: Routledge, 2009.)
 Dilemmas in Jewish-Arab Relations in Israel (Tel-Aviv: Schocken, 2005, in Hebrew).
 Sovereignty of God and Man: Sanctity and Political Centrality on the Temple Mount (Jerusalem: The Jerusalem Institute for Israel Studies, 2001 in Hebrew).

References

1952 births
Living people
Israeli political scientists
People from Rehovot
Israeli people of Hungarian-Jewish descent
Israeli people of German-Jewish descent
Israeli people of the Yom Kippur War
Academic staff of the Hebrew University of Jerusalem
Academic staff of the University of Haifa
Jewish scholars of Islam